The Average White Band (also known as AWB) are a Scottish funk and R&B band that had a series of soul and disco hits between 1974 and 1980. They are best known for their million-selling instrumental track "Pick Up the Pieces", and their albums AWB and Cut the Cake. The band name was initially proposed by Bonnie Bramlett. They have influenced others, such as the Brand New Heavies, and been sampled by various musicians, including the Beastie Boys, Public Enemy, TLC, The Beatnuts, Too Short, Ice Cube, Eric B. & Rakim, Nas, A Tribe Called Quest, Christina Milian, and Arrested Development, making them the 15th most sampled act in history. As of 2022, 50 years after their formation, they continue to perform.

Career

Formation
AWB was formed in early 1972 in London by Alan Gorrie, and Malcolm "Molly" Duncan, with Owen "Onnie" McIntyre, Michael Rosen (trumpet), Roger Ball, and Robbie McIntosh joining them in the original line-up. Hamish Stuart quickly replaced Rosen. Duncan and Ball, affectionately known as the Dundee Horns, studied at Duncan of Jordanstone College of Art (now part of the University of Dundee, but which at the time was part of the Dundee Institute of Art and Technology, now known as Abertay University), and were previously members of Mogul Thrash. Gorrie and McIntyre had been members of Forever More. McIntyre and McIntosh were used as session musicians on Chuck Berry's recording of "My Ding-a-Ling".

According to Duncan, members of the band had played together before in Scotland, but had moved to London separately and met up by chance at a Traffic concert. They decided to jam together; a friend heard them and remarked: "This is too much for the average white man," which became adapted as the name of the band.

Breakthrough
The band's breakthrough was a support slot at Eric Clapton's comeback concert in 1973. MCA Records released their debut album, Show Your Hand (1973), which sold poorly. Bruce McCaskill, who was Clapton's tour manager, liked the band's music and agreed to manage them. He borrowed money to take them to the US and to promote them. McCaskill had many contacts from his days with Clapton and managed to get Atlantic Records to sign them. The band relocated to Los Angeles and released the follow-up, AWB, better known as The White Album. It reached No. 1 and was the first of many with renowned producer Arif Mardin.

McIntosh died of a heroin overdose at a Los Angeles party on 23 September 1974. Gorrie also overdosed, but Cher kept him conscious until medical help arrived. The NME reported in January 1975 that AWB played a benefit show for McIntosh's widow at the Marquee Club in London. McIntosh was replaced by Steve Ferrone, previously of Bloodstone, who had replaced McIntosh before in Brian Auger's Oblivion Express.

In 1975, the single "Pick Up the Pieces", taken from the No. 1 AWB album, reached No. 1 on the US Billboard Hot 100 chart. The song knocked Linda Ronstadt's "You're No Good" out of No. 1 and sold over one million copies. It was awarded a gold disc by the R.I.A.A. in March 1975. It also prompted The J.B.'s, the backup band of the "Godfather of Soul", James Brown, to record and release a song in reply, "Pick Up the Pieces, One by One", under the name AABB (Above Average Black Band). It was both a tribute to AWB's knowledge of funk and a tongue-in-cheek play on the Scottish band's name.

AWB followed up with the LPs Cut the Cake (1975) and Soul Searching (1976), both big sellers and yielding further Top 40 singles. Cut the Cake was dedicated by the surviving band members to McIntosh's memory. A double live album "Person To Person" was issued in late 1976. Their next LP, Benny & Us, was a collaboration with Ben E. King.

Later career
After several more albums, "Warmer Communications" (1978), "Feel No Fret" (1979) and after a switch to the U.S. Arista label, "Shine" (1980) and "Cupid's In Fashion" (1982), AWB's audience and sales dwindled. The group initially disbanded by 1983. Their 1980 disco hit "Let's Go Round Again" (UK No. 12), was covered in the late 1990s by Louise.

Ferrone went on to work with Duran Duran and later with Tom Petty and The Heartbreakers from 1994 until Petty's death in 2017. Hamish Stuart joined Paul McCartney's touring group. In 1985 Gorrie released a solo album, Sleepless Nights.

The classic lineup of Gorrie, McIntyre, Ball, Stuart, Duncan and Ferrone reunited for one last time at the Atlantic Records 40th Anniversary in 1988. Gorrie, McIntyre, and Ball then continued in 1989 to record Aftershock. Alex Ligertwood (ex-Santana, Jeff Beck Group and another veteran of Brian Auger's Oblivion Express) also appeared on this album, replacing lead singer Hamish Stuart, along with Eliot Lewis who co-wrote with Gorrie and joined the band. Ligertwood left after the album's recording and drummer Tiger McNeil joined for the reunited band's live shows. McNeil was with the group until 1994. He was then succeeded by Peter Abbott (ex-Blood, Sweat & Tears), who in turn was replaced by Fred "Catfish" Alias in September 1998. Drummer Adam Deitch did a two-year stint with AWB from 1999 to 2001.

Average White Band has continued recording (1997's Soul Tattoo, 1999's Face to Face) and touring since. Ball worked on Soul Tattoo with the group but was replaced by Fred Vigdor (aka Freddy V.) in 1996.

Brian Dunne took over the drum chair in 2001 and when Eliot Lewis left the band in September 2002 to pursue other musical opportunities (including a stint with Hall and Oates), he was replaced by Klyde Jones.

Their line-up as of 2002 became Alan Gorrie (bass guitar, guitar, lead and backing vocals), Klyde Jones (keyboards, bass guitar, guitar, lead and backing vocals), Onnie McIntyre (guitar, vocals), Freddy V (sax, keyboards, vocals), and Brian Dunne (drums).

Dunne was replaced by Rocky Bryant as drummer as of the 2006 tour. After Jones left in 2011 to join Hall and Oates, Monte Croft (keyboards, bass, guitar) and former Earth, Wind & Fire member Morris Pleasure (keyboards, bass, guitar) came in to do brief stints before Rob Aries arrived in 2013.

Brent Carter (ex-Tower of Power) has been singing with AWB since 2011.

In July 2015, Malcolm 'Molly' Duncan, Steve Ferrone and Hamish Stuart reunited to form The 360 Band. This is in essence one half of the original AWB. They released an album titled Three Sixty in 2017 and performed live together along with supporting musicians. As of 2019, Alan Gorrie and Onnie McIntyre are the only two original members left in the Average White Band.

Original tenor sax player Molly Duncan died on 8 October 2019, shortly after it had been announced that he had been diagnosed with terminal cancer.

Members
Current members
 Alan Gorrie – bass, guitars, vocals, keyboards 
 Owen "Onnie" McIntyre – guitars, backing vocals 
 Fred Vigdor – tenor saxophone, keyboards 
 Rocky Bryant – drums 
 Brent Carter – vocals 
 Rob Aries – keyboards, bass 
 Cliff Lyons – alto saxophone 

Former members

 Roger Ball – alto saxophone, keyboards 
 Malcolm "Molly" Duncan – tenor saxophone 
 Robbie McIntosh – drums 
 Michael Rosen – trumpet, guitar 
 Hamish Stuart – guitar, bass, vocals 
 Steve Ferrone – drums 
 Eliot Lewis – keyboards, guitar, bass, percussion, vocals 
 Tiger McNeil – drums 
 Alex Ligertwood – vocals 
 Peter Abbott – drums 
 Fred "Catfish" Alias – drums 
 Adam Deitch – drums 
 Brian Dunne – drums 
 Klyde Jones – keyboards, guitar, bass, vocals 
 Morris Pleasure – keyboard, bass, guitar 
 Monte Croft – keyboard, bass, guitar

Timeline

Discography

Studio albums

Notes
1 Charted in 1975 when re-issued as Put It Where You Want It.

Live albums

Compilation albums

Singles

Other contributions
 Wish You Were Here (1974) – Average White Horns on "Just a Chance" and "Should I Smoke" – arranged by Roger Ball
 Up (1976) – Morrissey–Mullen
 The Atlantic Family Live at Montreux (1977)
 The Cosmos Theme (1978) – written by Alan Gorrie and Steve Ferrone, and recorded by the band under the pseudonym "The Cosmic Highlanders"

References

Bibliography
 The New Musical Express Book of Rock, 1975, Star Books,

External links

 Official website
 
 

Musical groups established in 1972
Scottish pop rock music groups
British funk musical groups
British soul musical groups
British disco groups
Musicians from Dundee
Atlantic Records artists
MCA Records artists
Arista Records artists
RCA Records artists
Rhino Records artists